Mark Samuel Weinberg  (born 13 May 1948) is a former judge of the Court of Appeal of the Supreme Court of Victoria from July 2008 to May 2018. He is a former judge of the Federal Court of Australia who served from July 1998 to July 2008.

Early life 
Weinberg was born in Sweden and lived in the United States until the age of 10, when he and his family moved to Melbourne. He attended Melbourne High School and later graduated with a Bachelor of Arts and Bachelor of Laws (First Class Honours) from Monash University. He was awarded the Supreme Court Prize in 1970, the year he graduated. In 1972 he received the Vinerian Scholarship for top graduate of the Bachelor of Civil Law from the University of Oxford. In 1975 he was called to the Victorian Bar.

Career 
From 1984 to 1985, Weinberg was dean of the Faculty of Law at the University of Melbourne, having previously served as acting dean and deputy dean.

In 1986, Weinberg was appointed Queen's Counsel. From 1988 until 1991, he was Commonwealth Director of Public Prosecutions.

After being appointed to the Federal Court in 1998, Weinberg also held appointments as deputy president of the Federal Police Disciplinary Tribunal, non-resident judge of the Supreme Court of Fiji, additional judge of the Supreme Court of the Australian Capital Territory and chief justice of the Supreme Court of Norfolk Island. He resigned from the Federal Court and his other appointments in 2008 in order to take up office as a judge of the Court of Appeal of the Supreme Court of Victoria.

In 2017, Weinberg was appointed an Officer of the Order of Australia for distinguished service to the judiciary and to the law, particularly through reforms to criminal law and procedure, to legal education in Victoria and to the administration of justice in Fiji and Norfolk Island.

Retirement 
On 9 May 2018, Weinberg retired from the Court of Appeal of the Supreme Court of Victoria after 10 years of service. He continued to hear cases as a reserve Judge.

In 2018, he presided over the jury trial of Dimitrious Gargasoulas, the perpetrator of the January 2017 Melbourne car attack which killed six people and injured 27. In February 2019, he sentenced Gargasoulas to life in prison with a non-parole period of 46 years.

In 2019, he was part of the three-member bench of the Court of Appeal which heard the appeal of Cardinal George Pell against convictions for sexual offences. The appeal was dismissed by majority, with Weinberg dissenting. In his dissenting reasons, Weinberg concluded that there was a "significant possibility" that Pell may not have committed the offences, and that there was "a significant body of cogent evidence casting serious doubt upon the complainant's account, both as to credibility and reliability". Subsequently, Pell successfully appealed to the High Court against the majority judgment, and the convictions were quashed.

Following the release of the Brereton Report, in December 2020, Weinberg was appointed by Home Affairs Minister Peter Dutton as the Special Investigator to investigate alleged war crimes by Australian soldiers in Afghanistan.

References 

Judges of the Federal Court of Australia
Fellows of the Australian Academy of Law
Monash Law School alumni
Alumni of the University of Oxford
Academic staff of the University of Melbourne
20th-century Australian judges
Australian prosecutors
Living people
Australian judges on the courts of Fiji
Supreme Court of Fiji justices
Directors of Public Prosecutions of Australia
Judges of the Supreme Court of the Australian Capital Territory
Officers of the Order of Australia
1948 births
Judges of the Supreme Court of Norfolk Island
Australian King's Counsel
21st-century Australian judges